Kanwar Singh Tanwar is an Indian politician who served as a Member of Parliament from Amroha constituency in Uttar Pradesh. He is a member of Bharatiya Janata Party.

Early life
Tanwar was born to Hukum Chand Tanwar and hails from Fatehpur Village of Chhatarpur in Delhi. He studied till 8th standard in Govt. Boys School Fatehpur, New Delhi in 1973.

Political career

May 2014: Elected to 16th Lok Sabha
1 Sep. 2014 onwards: Member, Standing Committee on Health and Family Welfare; Member, Consultative Committee, Ministry of Health and Family Welfare; Member, (Permanent Special Invitee), Consultative Committee, Ministry of Rural Development, Panchayati Raj and Drinking Water and Sanitation

References

1960s births
Living people
India MPs 2014–2019
Lok Sabha members from Uttar Pradesh
People from Amroha district
Bharatiya Janata Party politicians from Uttar Pradesh